Personality rights, sometimes referred to as the right of publicity, are rights for an individual to control the commercial use of their identity, such as name, image, likeness, or other unequivocal identifiers. They are generally considered as property rights, rather than personal rights, and so the validity of personality rights of publicity may survive the death of the individual to varying degrees, depending on the jurisdiction.

Classification
Personality rights are generally considered to consist of two types of rights: the right of publicity, or the right to keep one's image and likeness from being commercially exploited without permission or contractual compensation, which is similar (but not identical) to the use of a trademark; and the right to privacy, or the right to be left alone and not have one's personality represented publicly without permission. In common law jurisdictions, publicity rights fall into the realm of the tort of passing off. United States jurisprudence has substantially extended this right.

A commonly cited justification for this doctrine, from a policy standpoint, is the notion of natural rights and the idea that every individual should have a right to control how their right of publicity is commercialized by a third party, if at all.  Often, though certainly not always, the motivation to engage in such commercialization is to help propel sales or visibility for a product or service, which usually amounts to some form of commercial speech (which in turn receives the lowest level of judicial scrutiny).

Civil law and common law jurisdictions

In contrast with common law jurisdictions, most civil law jurisdictions have specific civil code provisions that protect an individual's image, personal data and other generally private information.  Exceptions have been carved out of these general, broad privacy rights when dealing with news and public figures. Thus, while it may violate an ordinary citizen's privacy to speak about their medical records, one is generally allowed to report on more intimate details in the lives of celebrities and politicians.

Unlike most common law jurisdictions the personality rights in civil law are generally inheritable, thus one can make a claim against someone who invades the privacy of a deceased relative if the memory of their character is besmirched by such publication.

Personality rights have developed out of common law concepts of property, trespass and intentional tort.  Thus personality rights are, generally speaking, judge-made law, though there are jurisdictions where some aspects of personality rights are statutory. In some jurisdictions, publicity rights and privacy rights are not clearly distinguished, and the term publicity right is generally used. In a publicity rights case the issue to decide is whether a significant section of the public would be misled into believing (incorrectly) that a commercial arrangement had been concluded between a plaintiff and a defendant under which the plaintiff agreed to the advertising involving the image or reputation of a famous person. The actionable misrepresentation requires a suggestion that the plaintiff has endorsed or licensed the defendant's products, or somehow can exercise control over those products. This is done by way of the tort of passing off.

The meaning of the law is best illustrated by principal cases on the subject.

Country-specific jurisdictions

Australia
In Australia, false association or endorsement is actionable via the law of passing off, not a separate law of "right of personality". The Henderson case was a decision of the Supreme Court of New South Wales (both the first instance and appellate jurisdiction). The plaintiffs were ballroom dancers and they sued the defendant in passing off alleging it wrongfully published their photograph on the cover of a gramophone record entitled Strictly for Dancing: Vol. 1. An injunction was granted on the ground that the use suggested the plaintiffs recommended or approved of the defendant's goods, or had some connection with the goods.

However, in the 1988 case of Honey v Australian Airlines, Gary Honey, a well known Australian athlete failed in his attempt to get a damages award after Australian Airlines used a photograph of him in action on a poster without his permission.  The judge held, in essence, that the poster depicted excellence in general rather than a particular person.

Canada

Statutory protection
The provinces of British Columbia, Manitoba, Newfoundland and Labrador, and Saskatchewan have enacted privacy legislation dealing with personality rights, which have the following traits:

 An appropriation of personality can be achieved through the use of a person's name, likeness, or voice (but British Columbia has a more restrictive definition).
 The plaintiff must be identified or identifiable by the use made of his persona.
 An action for the appropriation of personality can only succeed where the defendant intended to commit the wrong (but British Columbia has no "intention" requirement).
 The defendant's use of the plaintiff's persona must have resulted in a gain or advantage for the defendant (but British Columbia has a more restrictive definition, relating only to commercial gain).
 An appropriation of personality is actionable without proof of damages.
 The right of action for appropriation of personality is extinguished upon the death of the person whose privacy was violated.
 The following constitute statutory defences in all four provinces: (i) that the plaintiff consented to the use of his persona; (ii) that the use of the plaintiff's persona was incidental to the exercise of a lawful right of defence of person or property; (iii) that the use was authorized or required under a provincial law or by a court, or any process of a court; and (iv) that the act was that of a peace officer acting in the course of his or her duties. The Manitoba Act provides additional defences.

Common law provinces
Canadian common law recognizes a limited right to personality. It was first acknowledged in the 1971 Ontario decision of Krouse v. Chrysler Canada Ltd., where the Court held that where a person has marketable value in their likeness and it has been used in a manner that suggests an endorsement of a product then there is grounds for an action in appropriation of personality. This right was later expanded upon in Athans v. Canadian Adventure Camps (1977) where the Court held that the personality right included both image and name.

In Gould Estate v. Stoddart Publishing Co. Ltd. (1998), the Ontario Court of Appeal concluded that simply writing about somebody, even for the purpose of generating a profit, does not constitute appropriation of personality.

The general tort of appropriation of personality is still in development, but it is currently being argued that it will be recognized in all common law provinces, with certain characteristics:

 Athans confirms that there is "a proprietary right in the exclusive marketing for gain of his personality, image and name..."
 There is always a requirement that the plaintiff be identifiable.
 An action for appropriation of personality will have to be intentional for a plaintiff to recover at common law.
 There is a requirement that the defendant must have acted for the purpose of commercial gain, but Gould suggests that this may be restricted to "endorsement-type situations".
 It is a matter of uncertainty whether the common law tort of appropriation of personality is actionable per se or whether damages must be shown.
 Privacy rights are extinguished upon death, but personality rights are inheritable.
 A defendant will not be liable for an appropriation of personality at common law where: (i) he has consented to the use of his persona; (ii) the use made of his personality rights was merely incidental to another purpose; or (iii) the publication constituted a matter of public interest.

Quebec
In 1994, the new Civil Code of Quebec introduced new provisions that enshrine the right to privacy as an attribute of personality:

In Aubry v Éditions Vice-Versa Inc, the Supreme Court of Canada also affirmed that under Quebec's Charter of Human Rights and Freedoms privacy provisions, a photographer can take photographs in public places but may not publish the picture unless permission has been obtained from the subject, except where the subject appears in an incidental manner, or whose professional success depends on public opinion. The relevant provisions of the Charter are:

Therefore, the following general characteristics may be drawn:

 An appropriation of personality can be realized through the use of a person's name, likeness, or voice.
 The plaintiff must be recognizable in order  an appropriation of personality to be actionable.
 There is no need for the courts to look for an element of intent.
 Distinctions based on commercial purposes are irrelevant, and inconsistent with s 9.1 of the Quebec Charter.
 The plaintiff is required to show that she suffered damage through the appropriation of her personality rights.
 Quebec law may allow an action to be taken by the estate of a deceased person, provided that it can be proved that there is a patrimonial aspect at stake.
 A defendant will not be liable for an appropriation of personality under Quebec law where: (i) the plaintiff expressly or impliedly consented to the appropriation of his personality; (ii) the use of the individual's persona is incidental to another purpose; (iii) the appropriation of personality is authorized by law; or (iv) the publication is a matter of public interest.

Cyprus
In Cyprus, people depicted in photographs can oppose their use in advertisements and their publication in magazines, even if it was taken in a public place.

Denmark
In Denmark, the Danish Penal Code chapters 26 and 27, provides certain personality rights. The governmental Danish Data Protection Agency, has made a declaration regarding publication on the Internet of pictures taken of persons in a public area:
The predominant point of reference, is that any publication of a portrait photograph requires consent [of the person depicted]. The reasoning for this, is that such a publication might provide the depicted person with discomfort, possibly with other information such as name, of the publication for all with access to the internet, and the considerations of this discomfort is judged as more important than a possible interest in publication.
A portrait photograph is defined as a photograph, with the purpose of depicting one or more specific person(s). The personality rights however may be contracted for persons who are generally accepted as public persons.

France
In France personality rights are protected under article 9 of the French civil code.  While publicly known facts and images of public figures are not generally protected, use of someone's image or personal history has been held actionable under French law. The most famous case in recent history is perhaps the publication of the book on François Mitterrand called Le Grand Secret in which Mitterrand's doctor published a book that not only revealed private facts about Mitterrand's life, but also revealed medical confidences protected by doctor–patient privilege.

Germany
In Germany personality rights are protected under the German civil code, where the concept of an "absolute person of contemporary history" allows the depiction of individuals who are part of history but still gives them some protection of their rights of privacy outside the public sphere. A succinct statement of the German law can be found in the following judicial statement from the Marlene Dietrich case: the general right of personality has been recognised in the case law of the German Federal Court of Justice since 1954 as a basic right constitutionally guaranteed by Articles 1 and 2 of the Basic Law and at the same time as an "other right" protected in civil law under § 823 (1) of the BGB (established case law since BGHZ 13, 334, 338 - readers' letters). It guarantees as against all the world the protection of human dignity and the right to free development of the personality. Special forms of manifestation of the general right of personality are the right to one's own picture (§§ 22 ff. of the ) and the right to one's name (§ 12 of the BGB). They guarantee protection of the personality for the sphere regulated by them.

In addition to the general personality rights, there are special rules that forbid taking intimate pictures without consent (§ 184k StGB), and that forbid taking pictures which violate the “most personal sphere” of those pictured (§ 201 StGB - in particular, photos of private situations such as inside the bedroom, and photos of helpless persons, such as accident victims). In contrast to the general rules about the right to one's image, these rules also apply to just taking images, not only to publishing them.

Portugal
In Portugal personality rights are protected under the tutela geral da personalidade on article 70 of the Portuguese Civil Code and, also, in article 17 of the Constitution of the Portuguese Republic.
Some personality rights, like the right to image or honor are specifically typified in the civil code in the articles following the tutela geral.

Greece
The relevant Greek laws include 57 AK and 2472/1997. As regarding photography:
 Taking a picture of a person in a public space: Requires consent. Taking a photo or video of someone or drawing them in a painting constitutes an illegal act by itself according to Article 57 of the Greek Civil Code (57 ΑΚ, 57 Αστικός Κώδικας) even without any publication of the resulting photo, video or drawing. The law assumes that consent has been provided silently if the depicted person has been paid for the photography session. The law also provides some exceptions for persons of contemporary history. Furthermore, the law 2472/1997 also applies in many circumstances, even in photographing political rallies in public places or in photographing the police; Greece also requires photographers to obtain a government permit before photographing people participating in political protests in public places.
 Publishing pictures of a person in a public space: Requires consent. The publication of photographs of identifiable police officers beating civilians in public places may be against the law 2472/1997 and as such these images should be turned to the authorities for review.
 Commercial use of a published picture of a person in a public space: Requires consent.

Guernsey
The relevant Guernsey law was enacted on 3 December 2012 under the name of Image Rights Bailiwick of Guernsey Ordinance 2012 and allows for the registration of a personality right, together with images associated with that personality. Images are widely defined and can be any number of personal attributes, such as likeness, mannerisms, gestures, voice, nickname etc.

Personalities able to register fall into 5 categories, namely sole, joint, group, legal and fictional character. In addition, humans can be registered up to 100 years after the date of death, making the law very favourable for estate managers and trustees.

Hong Kong
In Hong Kong, as in most other common law jurisdictions, there is no separate "personality right", and false association or endorsement is actionable under the law of passing off. The main case on this point relates to Cantopop singer/actor Andy Lau and Hang Seng Bank over the allegedly unauthorized use of Lau's image on credit cards, which has led to the observation that only limited personality rights exist in this jurisdiction.

Jamaica
In a 1994 case involving the estate of Bob Marley, the Supreme Court of Jamaica acknowledged a property right of personality which survived his death.

Japan
In October 2007, J-pop duo Pink Lady sued Kobunsha for 3.7 million after the publisher's magazine Josei Jishin used photos of the duo on an article on dieting through dancing without their permission. The case was rejected by the Tokyo District Court. In February 2012, the Supreme Court rejected the duo's appeal based on the right of publicity.

Korea
While personality rights are said to exist to some extent by both influence of constitution, and tort liability, cases filed to enforce such rights against shopping malls have been unsuccessful.

People's Republic of China
In the People's Republic of China, rights of personality are established by statute. According to article 100 and 101 of the General Principle of Civil Law of the People's Republic of China, the right of name and the right of image are protected. It is prohibited to use another's image for commercial use without that person's consent. In the new Tort Liabilities Law which came into effect on Jan 1, 2021, the right of privacy is mentioned for the first time in the legislation.

Iran
There are few studies on the right to fame in Iranian law. However, through general principles, an attempt has been made to support celebrities.

South Africa
In South Africa personality rights are protected under the South African law of delict and the Bill of Rights, which also provides for freedom of expression and freedom of association. After much uncertainty concerning the recognition of image rights in South Africa, the Supreme Court of Appeal provided clarity in the landmark case of Grütter v Lombard. In South Africa, a person's right to identity is violated if the attributes of that person is used without permission in a way which cannot be reconciled with the true image of that person. Apart from the unauthorized use of a person's image, this kind of infringement also entails some kind of misrepresentation concerning the individual, such as that the individual approves or endorses a particular product or service or that an attorney is a partner in a firm, while this is not the case.  Secondly, the right to identity is violated if the attributes of a person is used without authorization by another person for commercial gain. Apart from the unauthorized use of the individual's image, such use also primarily entails a commercial motive which is exclusively aimed at promoting a service or product or to solicit clients or customers.  The mere fact that the user may benefit or profit from any product or service in respect of which the individual's attributes have incidentally been used, is not in itself sufficient.  This violation of the right to identity therefore also entails unauthorized use of the individual's attributes with a commercial purpose, whether it is done by means of advertisement or the manufacture and distribution of merchandise covered with the attributes of the individual. Personality rights are not absolute and it goes without saying that the use of a person's attributes must be unlawful before a plaintiff will succeed with any claim.  With the use of a person's image, the personality rights, privacy, human dignity and freedom of association of the individual must often be weighed against the user's right to freedom of expression.  The use of a person's image can be justified on the grounds of consent, truth and public interest, fair comment and jest.

Spain
According to the agency (Spanish) Data Protection for the collection and dissemination on Internet of images of a person without their consent may be a serious breach of the Data Protection Act which would be punishable by a minimum fine of 60,000 euros.  According to El Mundo Data Protection Agency decided to investigate ex officio by the mere distribution of the image of a person on the Internet without their consent.

United States

In the United States, the right of publicity is a state law–based right, as opposed to federal, and recognition of the right can vary from state to state. The rationale underlying the right of publicity in the United States is rooted in both privacy and economic exploitation.  The rights are based in tort law, and parallel Prosser's "Four Torts" which might be summarized as: 1) Intrusion upon physical solitude; 2) public disclosure of private facts; 3) depiction in a false light; and 4) appropriation of name and likeness.  If looking at it through the prism of Prosser's four torts, violation of a right of publicity most closely aligns with appropriation.  The right of publicity often is manifest in advertising or merchandise.  In states without a specific right of publicity statute, the right of publicity is usually recognized via common law.  The right of publicity has evolved rapidly, with a history of reported cases in the United States and worldwide.

The right of publicity is defined as the right of all individuals to control commercial use of their names, images, likenesses, or other identifying aspects of identity.  In certain contexts, the right of publicity is limited (under U.S. law) by the First Amendment. The right of publicity can be referred to as publicity rights or even personality rights. The term "right of publicity" was coined by Judge Jerome Frank in 1953.

The extent of recognition of this right in the U.S. is largely driven by statute or case law. Because the right of publicity is primarily governed by state (as opposed to federal) law, the degree of recognition of the right of publicity can vary from one state to the next. The right of publicity is not simply an analog to trademark law, though it could be noted that the right of publicity has some commonality with the protection of trademarks as long as one understands that the right of publicity is a distinct legal doctrine, with its own policies, objectives and standards, including notable differences from trademark law. For example, falsity or likelihood of confusion generally do not have to be established to present a colorable right of publicity claim.

At a national level, the U.S. Supreme Court held in the 1977 case Zacchini v. Scripps-Howard Broadcasting Co. that the First Amendment did not immunize a television station from liability for broadcasting Hugo Zacchini's human cannonball act without his consent. This was the first, and so far the only, U.S. Supreme Court ruling on rights of publicity and it served to confirm the overall validity of the doctrine and the interests it protects.

Indiana has one of the stronger right of publicity statutes in the U.S., providing recognition of the right for 100 years after death, and protecting not only the usual "name, image and likeness", but also signature, photograph, gestures, distinctive appearances, and mannerisms.  Notably, Oklahoma also provides 100 years of protection after death, and Tennessee's statute provides rights that do not ever expire if use is continuous. There are other notable characteristics of the Indiana law, though most of the major movement in right of publicity emanates from New York and California, with a significant body of case law which suggest potentially contradictory positions with respect to recognition of the right of publicity under certain circumstances.

Some states recognize the right through statute and some others through common law. California has both statutory and common-law strains of authority protecting slightly different forms of the right. The right of publicity shares characteristics of a property right and as such is transferable to the person's heirs after their death. The Celebrities Rights Act was passed in California in 1985 and it extended the personality rights for a celebrity to 70 years after their death. Previously, the 1979 Lugosi v. Universal Pictures decision by the California Supreme Court held that Bela Lugosi's personality rights could not pass to his heirs.

 In October 1990, actor Crispin Glover filed a lawsuit against Universal Studios for both the unauthorized use of his likeness and the use of footage of him from Back to the Future in Back to the Future Part II; his permission had not been sought for the latter and he received no payment. After a motion to dismiss was denied, the case was settled for an undisclosed amount. The Screen Actors Guild changed its rules to prohibit its members from unauthorized mimicking of other SAG members.
 In September 2002, Tom Cruise and Nicole Kidman sued luxury cosmetics company Sephora for allegedly using a picture of them without permission in a brochure promoting perfumes.
 In March 2003, eight members of the cast of The Sopranos alleged that electronics retailer Best Buy used their images in newspaper ads without permission.
 In the July 2003 case of ETW Corp. v. Jireh Publishing ruled that a painting of the golfer Tiger Woods and others is protected by the US Constitution's First Amendment and treads neither on the golfer's trademarks nor publicity rights. Similarly in the July 2003 case of Johnny and Edgar Winter v. DC Comics, a depiction of blues music duo the Winter brothers in a comic book as worms called the Autumn Brothers obtained First Amendment protection from publicity rights suit. In May 2005, Toney v. Oreal USA Inc. clarified the distinction between the purview of copyright versus the nature of publicity rights.
 The 2006 New York County Supreme Court case Nussenzweig v. DiCorcia, after dismissing the complaint on statute of limitations grounds, held in the alternative that personality rights are limited by First Amendment rights of artistic freedom of expression. The decision was affirmed on appeal by the Appellate Division and the Court of Appeals, but those courts only addressed the statute of limitations holding, not the First Amendment holding.
 In 2008, a federal judge in California ruled that Marilyn Monroe's right of publicity were not protectable in California.  The court reasoned that since Monroe was domiciled in New York at the time of her death, and New York does not protect a celebrity's deceased right of publicity and that her right of publicity ended upon her death.
 In the 2009 case of James "Jim" Brown v. Electronic Arts, Inc., the District Court of the Central District of California dismissed athlete Jim Brown's theory of false endorsement under the Lanham Act and determined that the First Amendment protects the unauthorized use of a trademark in an artistic work when the mark has artistic relevance to the work and does not explicitly mislead as to the source or content of the work. Applying this test, the court found a lack of implied endorsement and held that the First Amendment protected Electronic Arts in its use of a virtual football player that resembled Mr. Brown.
 On April 29, 2020, the NCAA Board of Governors supported proposed rules for college athletes expected to take effect in 2021. The rules would allow athletes to be paid for use of their name, image and likeness (NIL) in endorsements and appearances.

U.S. states that recognize rights of publicity

See also

Notes

References

Sources

Further reading
 
 Cornelius, Steve. "Image Rights in South Africa" 2008/3-4 International Sports Law Journal 71.
 Cornelius, Steve. "Commercial Appropriation of a Person's Image" 2011 Potchefstroom Electronic Law Journal 182.
 Cornelius, Steve. "Commercial Appropriation of Image: How Could Two Courts Get it so Wrong?" 2011/3-4 International Sports Law Journal 165.

External links

 Harvard Law School primer on personality rights and copyright
  Text of every individual state's right of publicity statute in the U.S.
  US constitutional constraints on state right of publicity laws  by Jerry Marr
 Case of Princess Caroline of Monaco (1995)  German Federal Supreme Court (English translation)
 Privacy rights cases under French law  (English translation)
 Privacy/personality rights under German law  (English translation)
 Personality rights US Library of Congress
 Das Recht am eigenen Bild, speech by G. Hug at a symposium in 2002 in Vitznau in Switzerland on personality rights in Switzerland regarding the publication of images of people. (In German.)
 Legal resource for personality rights cases in the U.S. 
 "Personality Rights in Canada: An Introduction", School of Law, University of Edinburgh
 Personality Rights Database - Personality rights in Argentina,  Australia, Canada, France, Germany, Mexico, South Africa, Spain, UK and US
 Douglas v Hello! - An OK! result, Gillian Black (University of Edinburgh), SCRIPT-ed, June 2007
 Video Gamemaker's Unauthorized Use of Jim Brown's Likeness Protected by the First Amendment by Jack C. Schecter
 Guernsey Image Rights - a practical guide

 
Entertainment law